Starokuzyakovo (İśke Küzäk) is a rural locality (a village) in Ishlinsky Selsoviet, Aurgazinsky District, Bashkortostan, Russia. The population was 362 as of 2010. There are 10 streets.

Geography 
Starokuzyakovo is located 30 km north of Tolbazy (the district's administrative centre) by road. Alexandrovka is the nearest rural locality.

References 

Rural localities in Aurgazinsky District